The Supreme Court (Building), is a court building located at 192-228 William Street in Melbourne, Australia. It is part of a complex of buildings which, together with the Supreme Court Library and Court of Appeal, are known as the Melbourne Law Courts.
It is currently the home to the Supreme Court of Victoria, the most senior court in the state of Victoria, and inferior only to the High Court of Australia. The Supreme Court has occupied the site since its first sitting in February 1884.

History
The Supreme Court Building was constructed between 1874 and 1884.

The design for this major public work was to be decided by design competition, with the Public Works Department to preside over the judging. Architects Alfred Louis Smith and Arthur Ebden Johnson won the competition for their design, subsequently creating a major scandal when it came to light that Johnson, who was a member of the judging panel, was a part of the winning submission. Johnson subsequently resigned from the Public Works Department and joined Smith to form a successful and highly influential partnership.

At the time of its construction it was the largest single building project being undertaken in the country and was the last major public building project to be undertaken before the depression of 1893 halted almost all construction projects until the beginning of the 20th century. It remains to this day the largest single-design network of court buildings in Australia.

Architecture
The Supreme Court Building is a grand example of the classical Renaissance Revival style.

The building is constructed with two storeys of brick founded on Malmsbury bluestone footings. The façade itself is faced with Tasmanian freestone and features an elaborate double arcade of Ionic and Composite columns along the William Street boundary. All four facades feature plentiful use of blind arcades. A variety of treatments are applied to the window openings and aedicules, variously being round arched, broken pediments, or flat arched. Above the William Street entrance to the court is seated the bronze figure of Lady Justice which is about twice life size. It is an unusual representation of Justice as the figure is not blindfolded and the scales of justice are not held aloft, but rest on her knee.

The building itself is a perfect square enclosing a circular courtyard with each street facade measuring 85 metres. A covered carriageway leads from Lonsdale Street to the central courtyard, in which sits the Supreme Court Library. The design of the library is appropriate to the Renaissance Palazzo style with its three floors forming a rusticated base, piano nobile, and attic storey. Of the eight court rooms, one court occupies each of the four corners of the square, with the remaining four courts occupying the lateral north and south wings. The remaining areas are occupied by administrative offices and Judges' Chambers. The interior of the building features elaborate moulded plasterwork on the walls and ceilings, as well as robust detailing of the benches, Judges' canopies, and cedar panelling.

The design is reputed to be based on the design of James Gandon's Four Courts building in Dublin, Ireland, following a suggestion to Smith & Johnson by Chief Justice Sir William Stawell.

Gallery

References

Buildings and structures in Melbourne City Centre
Government buildings completed in 1884
Heritage-listed buildings in Melbourne
Neoclassical architecture in Australia
Victorian architecture in Victoria (Australia)
Brick buildings and structures
Landmarks in Melbourne
Courthouses in Melbourne
1884 establishments in Australia